The 2016–17 Liga MX season  (known as the Liga BBVA Bancomer MX for sponsorship reasons) was the 70th professional season of the top-flight football league in Mexico. The season is split into two championships—the Torneo Apertura and the Torneo Clausura—each in an identical format and each contested by the same eighteen teams. The fixtures were announced on 9 June 2016.

Teams, stadiums, and personnel
The following eighteen teams are competing this season. Sinaloa was relegated to the Ascenso MX after accumulating the lowest coefficient last season. Sinaloa will be replaced by the 2016 Clausura Ascenso MX champion Necaxa, who won promotion after defeating the Apertura 2015 winner Juárez in a promotion play-off.

Stadiums and locations

Stadium Changes

Personnel and kits

Managerial changes

Torneo Apertura
The Apertura 2016 is the first championship of the season. The regular season began on July 15, 2016 and ended on December 25, 2016. Pachuca are the defending champions, having won their 6th title.

Regular season

Standings

Positions by round
The table lists the positions of teams after each week of matches. In order to preserve chronological evolvements, any postponed matches are not included in the round at which they were originally scheduled, but added to the full round they were played immediately afterwards. For example, if a match is scheduled for matchday 13, but then postponed and played between days 16 and 17, it will be added to the standings for day 16.

Results

Regular Season statistics

Top goalscorers
Players sorted first by goals scored, then by last name.

Source: ESPN FC

Top assists
Players sorted first by assists, then by last name.

Source: ESPN FC

Hat-tricks

Clean sheets

Source: Fox Soccer

Saves

Source: Fox Soccer

Attendance

Per team

Highest and lowest

Source: Liga MX website

Liguilla - Apertura

Bracket

 Teams are re-seeded each round.
 Team with more goals on aggregate after two matches advances.
 Away goals rule is applied in the quarterfinals and semifinals, but not the final.
 In the quarterfinals and semifinals, if the two teams are tied on aggregate and away goals, the higher seeded team advances.
 In the final, if the two teams are tied after both legs, the match goes to extra-time and, if necessary, a shootout.
 Both finalists qualify to the 2018 CONCACAF Champions League (in Pot 3).

Quarterfinals

Semifinals

Finals

Torneo Clausura
The Clausura 2017 is the second championship of the season. The regular phase of the tournament began on January 6, 2017.

Games scheduled for Round 10 were suspended due to a strike called by the Asociación Mexicana de Árbitros (Mexican Referee's Association).

Regular season

Standings

Positions by round
The table lists the positions of teams after each week of matches. In order to preserve chronological evolvements, any postponed matches are not included in the round at which they were originally scheduled, but added to the full round they were played immediately afterwards. For example, if a match is scheduled for matchday 13, but then postponed and played between days 16 and 17, it will be added to the standings for day 16.

Matches scheduled for Round 10 were postponed due to a strike called by the Asociación Mexicana de Árbitros (Mexican Referee's Association). Round 10 matches which were scheduled to take place between March 10 and March 12 were rescheduled to take place between April 11 and April 13. (between Rounds 13 and 14)

Results

Regular season statistics

Top goalscorers
Players sorted first by goals scored, then by last name.

Source: ESPN FC

Top assists
Players sorted first by assists, then by last name.

Source: ESPN FC

Hat-tricks

Clean sheets

Source: Fox Soccer

Saves

Source: Fox Soccer

Attendances

Liguilla - Clausura

Bracket

 Teams are re-seeded each round.
 Team with more goals on aggregate after two matches advances.
 Away goals rule is applied in the quarterfinals and semifinals, but not the final.
 In the quarterfinals and semifinals, if the two teams are tied on aggregate and away goals, the higher seeded team advances.
 In the final, if the two teams are tied after both legs, the match goes to extra-time and, if necessary, a shootout.
 Both finalists qualify to the 2018 CONCACAF Champions League (in Pot 3).

Quarterfinals

Semifinals

Finals

Relegation table

Last update: 7 May 2017
 Rules for relegation: 1) Relegation coefficient; 2) Goal difference; 3) Number of goals scored; 4) Head-to-head results between tied teams; 5) Number of goals scored away; 6) Fair Play points
 R = Relegated. Chiapas were relegated based on having a worse goal difference over the last three years than Veracruz.
Source: LigaMX

Aggregate table
The aggregate table (the sum of points of both the Apertura and Clausura tournaments) will be used to determine the participants of the Apertura 2017 Copa MX. This table also displays teams that have qualified for the 2018 CONCACAF Champions League.

References

External links
 Official website of Liga MX

 
Mx

1
Liga MX seasons